Jepchirchir (also spelled Chepchirchir) is a name of  Kalenjin origin. It indicates that the bearer meaning a girl or woman who was born "after a short labour" ("Chirchir"). The masculine equivalent of this name is Kipchirchir.

People

Athletes
Bilha Chepchirchir (born 1990), Kenyan international volleyball player
Caroline Jepchirchir Chepkwony (born 1985), Kenyan road runner
Cynthia Chepchirchir Kosgei (born 1993), Kenyan road runner and winner of the Berlin Half Marathon
Dorcas Jepchirchir Kiptarus (born 1990), Kenyan runner at the 2008 World Cross Country Championships
Flomena Chepchirchir (born 1981), Kenyan marathon runner
Joyce Jepchirchir Chebii (born 1978), Kenyan sports shooter at the 2014 Commonwealth Games
Justina Chepchirchir (born 1968), Kenyan middle-distance runner and four-time African Champion
Peres Jepchirchir (born 1993), Kenyan runner and half marathon world champion
Sarah Chepchirchir (born 1984), Kenyan half marathon runner
Zipporah Jepchirchir Kittony, Kenyan politician elected to the Senate of Kenya in 2013

References

Kalenjin names